Huang Pi-twan (born 14 November 1945) is a Taiwanese politician. She was the political deputy minister of the Ministry of Education from 2013 to 2014. Previously, she had served as minister of the Council for Cultural Affairs between 2008 and 2009.

Education
Huang obtained her bachelor's and master's degrees in political science from National Taiwan University in 1968 and 1971, respectively, and her doctorate in literature from the University of Wisconsin–Madison in the United States in 1980.

Academic career
After completing graduate school, Huang returned to Taiwan to become an associate professor and then chairperson at the Department of Foreign Languages and Literature of National Sun Yat-sen University in Kaohsiung City from 1980 to 1992. From 1992 to 1995, she was the deputy director of National Chiang Kai-shek Cultural Center in Taipei City. From 1995 to 1997, she served as the chairperson of the Department of Foreign Languages and Literature of National Chi Nan University (NCNU) in Nantou County. From 1997 to 2000, she headed the Department of Higher Education of the Ministry of Education. In 2000, she became the dean of the College of Humanities of NCNU. Huang served a six-year term as president of Tainan National University of the Arts in Tainan County from 2000 to 2006. From 2006 to 2007, she was a department chair Shih Chien University in Taipei City. After a promotion to Political Deputy Minister for 2013–2014, Huang left the Ministry of Education and was named the leader of PEN International's Taipei Chinese Center.

References

Living people
National Taiwan University alumni
 University of Wisconsin–Madison College of Letters and Science alumni
21st-century Taiwanese women writers
1945 births
Taiwanese publishers (people)
Academic staff of Tainan National University of the Arts
Women government ministers of Taiwan
Academic staff of the National Sun Yat-sen University
Academic staff of the National Chi Nan University
Academic staff of Shih Chien University
Taiwanese Ministers of Culture
Taiwanese people from Fujian
Politicians from Quanzhou
Republic of China politicians from Fujian
Educators from Fujian
Writers from Fujian